Echourouk Group SA (Echourouk Group) is an Algerian Generalist channel, Information and Sport. It is headquartered in Algiers. two years after the official launch of Echorouk TV, on 19 March 2014, the Foundation launched another channel, Echorouk News TV, and three years later Echourouk Group launched a special channel for women and cooking CBC Benna.

Corporate divisions

References

External links
Echourouk Group

Television production companies of Algeria
Arabic-language television stations